Marnie Fogg is a media consultant in all aspects of the fashion industry. She has a Master’s Degree in Art and Design Advanced practice and theory. She has lectured in Visual Studies and the Culture of Fashion and the University of Nottingham.

She is the author of over 25 books on fashion and related subjects including: The Dress: 100 Ideas that Changed Fashion Forever, Vintage Handbags: Collecting and Wearing Designer Classics, Vintage Weddings, Vintage Fashion Illustration from Harper’s Bazarr 1930 - 1970, and a series of books “Vintage Patterns” that cover the decades 1920’s thru 1980’s.

Works
 Boutique: A 60's Cultural Phenomenon, published by Mitchell Beazley in 2003.
 Print in Fashion, published by Batsford in 2005.
 Couture Interiors, published by Laurence King in 2007.

References 

Year of birth missing (living people)
Living people
21st-century British women writers